Brian Morton may refer to:

Brian Morton (American writer) (born 1955), American academic and novelist
Brian Morton (Scottish writer) (born 1954), Scottish broadcaster, journalist and writer, who is most widely known as a jazz critic
Brian Morton (canoeist) (born 1970), Australian sprint canoeist